Results of India national football team from 1990–1999.

1991

1992

1993

1994

1995

1996

1997

1998

1999

See also
Indian women's national football team results (1990–1999)
India national football team results (1980–1989)
India national football team results (2000–2009)
History of the India national football team

References

Football
1990